The Department of Industry and Commerce was an Australian government department that existed between May 1982 and December 1984. It was the second so-named Australian Government department.

Scope
Information about the department's functions and/or government funding allocation could be found in the Administrative Arrangements Orders, the annual Portfolio Budget Statements and in the Department's annual reports.

At its creation, the Department dealt with:
manufacturing and tertiary industries, 
adjustment assistance to industry, 
small business and
shipbuilding.

Structure
The Department was an Australian Public Service department, staffed by officials who were responsible to the Minister for Industry and Commerce.

References

Industry and Commerce
Ministries established in 1982
1982 establishments in Australia
1984 disestablishments in Australia